WISE J004945.61+215120.0 is a brown dwarf of spectral class T8.5, located in constellation Andromeda at approximately 24 light-years from Earth.

Discovery
WISE J004945.61+215120.0 was discovered in 2012 by Mace et al. from data, collected by Wide-field Infrared Survey Explorer (WISE) Earth-orbiting satellite — NASA infrared-wavelength 40 cm (16 in) space telescope, which mission lasted from December 2009 to February 2011. In 2013, the discovery paper was published.

Distance
Currently the most accurate distance estimate of WISE J004945.61+215120.0 is a trigonometric parallax, published in 2019 by Kirkpatrick et al.:  pc, or  ly.

References

Brown dwarfs
T-type stars
Andromeda (constellation)
WISE objects